01099 (i.e. zero ten ninety-nine) is a German rap crew from Dresden. The name refers to the postal code of Innere Neustadt (01099), the rappers' place of origin.

The group consists of four men called Dani, Gustav, Paul and Zachi.

History 

The four members found each other partly as orchestra musicians and attended the St. Benno highschool together. They also knew each other before their highschool days, but they only formed as 01099 in 2018.

In autumn of 2019, they released their debut EP Skyr. The title is based on the Icelandic curd of the same name, and the accompanying song can be understood as both, an ode to curd and a parody of current hip-hop culture. According to the band themselves, the group understood their music at the time more as a parody and fun project.

In 2020, their debut album Morgensonne was released. On this album, the musicians somewhat distanced themselves from the parodic approach and tried their hand at being rappers who primarily want to convey an attitude to life. Accordingly, the album is also somewhat melancholic. Shortly after the release of the album, the group split up and the four rappers moved to different cities to study. In the meantime, it is mainly the members Paul, Zachi and Gustav who appear. Dani, on the other hand, has taken a back seat due to his horn studies, but is still part of the group.
In an interview with World Wide Wohnzimmer, Paul stated that he had given up his music studies after two weeks in order to pursue a musical career.

01099 gained greater notoriety through the single Frisch, which was released in December 2020 and gained widespread popularity, especially via the platform TikTok. On March 26, 2021, Frisch entered the German singles chart at number 78 and peaked at number 36. The crew was signed by Groove Attack in 2021.

On May 14, 2021, 01099 released their single Durstlöscher. This, like Frisch, is part of the EP Dachfenster which was released on July 2, 2021. In November 2021, the band completed their first tour, which was limited due to the COVID-19 pandemic. Another tour for the album Altbau followed in April 2022.

Since the release of Frisch und Durstlöscher, the music group has collected 5.5 million and 7.4 million clicks on YouTube, and 73.5 million and 70.7 million clicks on the streaming platform Spotify (as of 1 January 2023).

After the pandemic, 01099 played at the following festivals in 2022:
 Superbloom 2022, dated September 3-4
 Heroes Festival 2022, dated September 9-10
 Dockville 2022, dated August 19-21
 FM 4 Frequency Festival 2022, dated August 17-20
 Szene Open Air 2022, dated August 4-6
 Splash! Festival Blue Edition 2022, dated July 7-9
 Splash! Festival Red Edition 2022, dated sometime in June
 PULS Open Air 2022, dated June 9-11

Furthermore, the group played 16 concerts in Germany, Austria and Switzerland, also in 2022.

Style 
The group cites the renunciation of sexist content as one of its basic principles. 01099 cites Money Boy and RIN as inspiration for their own art.

Members

Discography

Studio albums

EPs

Singles

As lead musician 

1 Weihnachtslied 2021 could not place in the official German single charts, but reached eleventh place in the single trend charts (3 December 2021).

As Guests

Awards 
Anmerkung: Auszeichnungen in Ländern aus den Charttabellen bzw. Chartboxen sind in ebendiesen zu finden.

External links 
 Official Website  on Facebook

References 

German rappers
German hip hop groups
Musicians from Dresden